Pavel Vokoun (born 22 May 1970) is a Czech swimmer. He competed in three events at the 1988 Summer Olympics.

References

External links
 

1970 births
Living people
Czech male swimmers
Olympic swimmers of Czechoslovakia
Swimmers at the 1988 Summer Olympics
Sportspeople from Prague